Matthias Warnig (born 26 July 1955) is a former East German Stasi officer and a Russia-based businessman who has worked closely with Vladimir Putin. He joined Stasi, the secret police of communist East Germany, in 1974. During the Cold War he engaged in financial crimes by attempting to infiltrate and spy against banks in the Federal Republic of Germany (West Germany). After Stasi was disbanded as a criminal organization as a result of the fall of Communism, he was left unemployed and moved to Russia, where he took part in business ventures in cooperation with Putin, whom he had already known as a Stasi officer. He is managing director (CEO) of Nord Stream AG, a company that is majority-owned by the Russian government and that is responsible for the construction and operation of the Nord Stream undersea gas pipeline from Russia to Germany. Warnig is under personal sanctions in the United States over his ties to the Russian government and Putin, and what the US government considers to be a Russian geopolitical project. As of 2023 he is also under personal sanctions in the United Kingdom as a collaborator with the Putin regime who is "involved in destabilising Ukraine or undermining or threatening the territorial integrity, sovereignty or independence of Ukraine, or obtaining a benefit from or supporting the Government of Russia."

Biography
He was born on 26 July 1955 in Altdöbern, Lower Lusatia, East Germany.

In 1974 Warnig started his career at the Stasi, the secret police of communist East Germany. Warnig allegedly worked with KGB officer Vladimir Putin. The two men collaborated on recruiting West German citizens for the KGB. Warnig, however, has denied this by saying that they met for the first time in 1991, when Putin was the head of the Committee for External Relations of the Saint Petersburg Mayor's Office.

In the late 1970s, Warnig received five years of training on how to infiltrate banks in West Germany.

Warnig had apparently spied on Dresdner Bank AG in West Germany for two years in the late 1980s before he began to work in the bank.

He resigned as a major from the Stasi in 1989.

Dresdner Bank attempted to get a banking operating license in Saint Petersburg, where Putin was now in charge of foreign economic relations. Warnig took part in negotiations. The office was opened in 1991. Warnig became Chairman of the Board of Directors of Dresdner Bank ZAO, Dresdner Bank Russian's subsidiary. In 2004–05, the bank advised on the controversial forced sale of Yukos assets (see Yukos shareholders v. Russia).

During violent gang wars involving the Tambov Gang while it was taking control of St. Petersburg's energy trade in the 1990s, Maria Vorontsova and her sister Katerina Tikhonova were sent by their father Vladimir Putin, who feared for their safety, to Germany where their legal guardian was Warnig.

From 2012, Warnig led the supervisory board of Rusal but was forced to resign in 2018, when the Trump administration imposed sanctions on Rusal.

Warnig and Nordstream AG were under US sanctions but the Biden administration lifted those in May 2021. Sanctions were later reimposed on him on February 23, 2022, in response to the 2021–2022 Russo-Ukrainian crisis and the Russian invasion of Ukraine.

Notes

References

Citations

Works cited

External links

 Nord Stream, Matthias Warnig (codename "Arthur") and the Gazprom Lobby Eurasia Daily Monitor Volume: 6 Issue: 114
 Matthias Warnig: "What is good for Russia is good for Germany” by Irina Reznik, The Vedomosti 11 October 2006 (translation at the website of Nord Stream AG, includes biography of Matthias Warnig)

1955 births
Living people
People from Altdöbern
Stasi officers
Yukos
Gazprom people
German chief executives
Dresdner Bank
FC Schalke 04 non-playing staff
Individuals sanctioned by the United States Department of State